Antonio Franja (born 8 June 1978) is a retired Croatian professional footballer who played as a left winger.

Club career
Franja been through football school NK Dinamo Zagreb. As a junior he signed with NK Croatia Zagreb (Dinamo ). He later went on a loan to NK Croatia Sesvete and as a 20 year old player he won the best second division player trophy. He then moved to NK Hrv. Dragovoljac for only one season. Then he signed with NK Zagreb and in 2001/2002 season they won the championship. In the 2002/2003 season he was signed to Turkish club Bursaspor. Franja moved to Portugal in the summer of 2005 to Vitória de Setúbal, where he remained for one season before returning to Croatia to play for HNK Šibenik.

Franja's only first team goal came on 6 January 2006, in a Primeira Liga game against C.D. Nacional.

Franja was part of the Vitória de Setúbal side who played in the 2005 Supertaça Cândido de Oliveira, and reached the final of the 2005–06 Taça de Portugal. 

For the 2007/2008 season he signed with Jeonbuk Hyundai Motors in South Korea and after one year he returned to Croatia where he stopped playing professional football and started playing Futsal first division for MNK Uspinjaca. He finished his career in MNK Futsal Dinamo where he continued to work in the club.

References

External links
 
 

1978 births
Living people
Footballers from Zagreb
Association football wingers
Croatian footballers
NK Samobor players
NK Croatia Sesvete players
NK Hrvatski Dragovoljac players
NK Zagreb players
Bursaspor footballers
NK Inter Zaprešić players
Vitória F.C. players
HNK Šibenik players
Jeonbuk Hyundai Motors players
Croatian Football League players
Süper Lig players
Primeira Liga players
K League 1 players
Croatian expatriate footballers
Expatriate footballers in Turkey
Croatian expatriate sportspeople in Turkey
Expatriate footballers in Portugal
Croatian expatriate sportspeople in Portugal
Expatriate footballers in South Korea
Croatian expatriate sportspeople in South Korea